The 1968 Boise State Broncos football team represented Boise State College during the 1968 NAIA football season, the first season of Bronco football at the four-year level. It was the first of two seasons Boise played as an NAIA independent after departing the NJCAA and the Intermountain Collegiate Athletic Conference. It was also the first season under the school's new name, after being known as Boise College since 1965.

The Broncos played their home games on campus at the original Bronco Stadium in Boise, Idaho. 
Led by first-year head coach Tony Knap, who succeeded legendary Bronco head coach Lyle Smith, the Broncos finished with an  record. After starting the season 1–2, the Broncos finished strong with seven straight victories, including wins over Evergreen Conference champions Central Washington and in-state rivals Idaho State and the College of Idaho. BSC was listed among the top thirty small college teams at the end of the season.

Schedule

References

Boise State
Boise State Broncos football seasons
Boise State Broncos football